Ángel Martín (born 25 November 1978) is a retired Andorran football midfielder.

References

1978 births
Living people
Andorran footballers
Andorra international footballers
FC Santa Coloma players
Association football midfielders